Pericyclocera is a genus of flies in the family Phoridae.

Species
P. arachnophila Borgmeier, 1931
P. cata (Melander & Brues, 1903)
P. diptychogastra Schmitz, 1940
P. floricola Borgmeier, 1966
P. graminicola Borgmeier, 1969
P. javicola Beyer, 1959
P. maculiventris Borgmeier, 1969
P. molliventris Schmitz, 1928
P. parianae Borgmeier, 1969

References

Phoridae
Platypezoidea genera